Clathrin heavy chain 1 is a protein that in humans is encoded by the CLTC gene.

Clathrin is a major protein component of the cytoplasmic face of intracellular organelles, called coated vesicles and coated pits. These specialized organelles are involved in the intracellular trafficking of receptors and endocytosis of a variety of macromolecules.  The basic subunit of the clathrin coat is composed of three heavy chains and three light chains.

Interactions
CLTC has been shown to interact with PICALM and HGS.

See also
 Clathrin

References

Further reading

External links